Arthur Gibbs Sylvester is an American structural geologist. He is an emeritus professor of geology at the University of California, Santa Barbara and the author of Roadside Geology of Southern California (2016) and the second edition of Geology Underfoot in Southern California (2020), both published by Mountain Press.

References

External links

American geologists
University of California, Santa Barbara faculty
Pomona College alumni
University of California, Los Angeles alumni
Structural geologists
Year of birth missing (living people)
Living people